Yugo-Zapadnaya, is a station on the Sokolnicheskaya line of the Moscow Metro. The station opened in 1963. The name, Yugo-Zapadnaya, means southwest in Russian and indicates its location in the southwestern part of the city and in the former Yugo-Zapad residential district. It was the southern terminus of the Sokolnicheskaya line until December 8, 2014, when Troparyovo station opened.

Design
Like dozens of other Metro stations dating to the 1960s, the station was built according to the standard column tri-span or "centipede" design. The architect was Ya. V. Tatarzhinskaya. Visually nondescript, the station's colour scheme is mainly white. Yugo-Zapadnaya has four entrances, all grouped around the intersection of Vernadskogo Avenue and Pokryshkina Street.

Gallery

References

Moscow Metro stations
Railway stations in Russia opened in 1963
Sokolnicheskaya Line
Railway stations located underground in Russia